"The Rains Came" is a song written by Huey P. Meaux and originally recorded by Big Sambo and the House Wreckers in 1962, reaching #74 on the Billboard Hot 100 chart that year.

Sir Douglas Quintet covered the song as a single in late 1965. Their version reached #31 on the Billboard Hot 100 in January 1966.

Freddy Fender covered the song as the third single from his 1977 album Rock 'n' Country. His version was the most successful, peaking at #4 on the Billboard Hot Country Singles chart and reaching #1 on the RPM Country Tracks chart in Canada.

Chart performance

Big Sambo

Sir Douglas Quintet

Freddy Fender

Year-end charts

References

1962 singles
1965 singles
1977 singles
Freddy Fender songs
Songs written by Huey P. Meaux
Song recordings produced by Huey P. Meaux
1962 songs
Dot Records singles